Contrastive Hebbian learning is a biologically plausible form of Hebbian learning.

It is based on the contrastive divergence algorithm, which has been used to train a variety of energy-based latent variable models.

In 2003, contrastive Hebbian learning was shown to be equivalent in power to the backpropagation algorithms commonly used in machine learning.

References

See also 
 Oja's rule
 Generalized Hebbian algorithm

Hebbian theory
Artificial neural networks